Carlogonus robustior, is a species of round-backed millipede in the family Harpagophoridae. It is endemic to Sri Lanka.

References

Spirostreptida
Millipedes of Asia
Arthropods of Sri Lanka
Endemic fauna of Sri Lanka
Animals described in 1936